The Norwood railway station was a railway station on the Crookwell railway line, New South Wales, Australia. The station opened in 1902 with the opening of the line, and consisted of a  platform on the down side of the line with a loop siding on the up side. The siding was removed in 1941 and the station closed in 1943 and was subsequently demolished. The line through Norwood closed to goods traffic in 1984.

References

Disused regional railway stations in New South Wales
Railway stations in Australia opened in 1902
Railway stations closed in 1943